The women's tournament of handball at the 2011 Pan American Games in Guadalajara, Mexico will take place from 15 October to 23 October,  All games were held at the San Rafael Gymnasium. The defending champions are Brazil, who won the title on home court. The winner of the competition will qualify for the 2012 Summer Olympics in London, Great Britain.

Teams

Qualification
A National Olympic Committee may enter one women's team for the handball competition. Mexico, the host nation along with seven other countries qualified through regional competitions.

Canada Versus United States series

Last chance qualifying tournament
 Chile will play in the Pan American Games in Guadalajara because Canada, Costa Rica and El Salvador withdrew from participating in the playoff that gave the last ticket to the competition.

Squads

At the start of tournament, all eight participating countries had 15 players on their rosters. Final squads for the tournament were due on September 14, 2011, a month  before the start of 2011 Pan American Games.

Format
 Eight teams are split into 2 preliminary round groups of 4 teams each. The top 2 teams from each group qualify for the knockout stage.
 The third and fourth placed teams will play the fifth to eight bracket.
 In the semifinals, the matchups are as follows: A1 vs. B2 and B1 vs. A2
 The winning teams from the semifinals play for the gold medal. The losing teams compete for the bronze medal.

Ties are broken via the following the criteria, with the first option used first, all the way down to the last option:
 Head to head results.
 Goal difference in the matches between the teams concerned.
 Greater number of plus goals in the matches between the teams concerned.

Draw
The draw for the tournament was held at the offices of the Organising Committee (COPAG) for the Games in Guadalajara on July 21 at 16:00 local time.

The competing are drawn to each group by couples. The first team selected randomly in the draw goes to group A and the second to Group B. The pots are based on the performance of national teams in both previous games and their standings in their respective regional competitions.

Preliminary round
All times are local (UTC-5).

Group A

Group B

Knockout stage

Bracket

5th–8th place semifinals

Semifinals

Seventh place match

Fifth place match

Bronze medal match

Gold medal match

Ranking and statistics

{| class="wikitable" style="text-align:center"
!width=40|Rank
!width=180|Team
|-bgcolor=#ccffcc
|  || align=left|
|-bgcolor=#ccccff
|  || align=left|
|-bgcolor=#ccccff
|  || align=left|
|-
| 4 || align=left|
|-
| 5 || align=left|
|-
| 6 || align=left|
|-
| 7 || align=left|
|-
| 8 || align=left|
|}

Top scorers

Source: Guadalajara 2011

Top goalkeepers

Source: Guadalajara 2011

Medalists

References

External links
Schedule

Handball at the 2011 Pan American Games
Women's handball in Mexico
2011 in women's handball